The Nantlle Railway (or Nantlle Tramway) was a Welsh narrow gauge railway. It was built to carry slate from several slate quarries across the Nantlle Valley to the harbour at Caernarfon for export by sea. The line provided a passenger service between Caernarfon and Talysarn from 1856 to 1865. It was the first public railway to be operated in North Wales.

A tramway linking the Nantlle slate quarries to Caernarfon was proposed in the 1810s. The Nantlle Railway was authorised by an Act of Parliament in May 1825, and the company began construction of the railway. The line was designed and constructed by George Stephenson and his son, Robert. The line opened in 1828 and was operated using horses. [George Stephenson and his BROTHER Robert,  not his son Robert; viz. letters from Robert snr. to his brother in Liverpool quoted by Boyd (N.Caerns Vol.I p.15>). These letters in the Phillimore collection and the Institution of Mechanical Engineers.]

During the 1860s and 1870s, a portion of the line was replaced by the standard gauge branch of the London and North Western Railway (LNWR) which acquired the line in the late 1860s. The Nantlle Railway was closed in 1963 by British Railways (BR), when it was the last line to be operated by BR using horse traction. Much of the route has been overlaid with roads or obliterated by other developments, but several railway structures remain.

History

Background
The first proposals for a railway in the Nantlle Valley were made during 1813. Slate quarries had developed to north and west of Nantlle, and the slate was transported to wharves at Caernarfon by pack horse. A more efficient system was required to enable the quarries to compete with Dinorwic and Penrhyn.

A  route for the line was surveyed, running westwards from tramways linked to the quarries, towards Talysarn and Penygroes. The line then turned northwards, passing through Groeslon, Llanwnda, Dinas and Bontnewydd. The line was also carried copper from the mine at Drws-y-coed, to the east of Nantlle.

The Act of Parliament for the Nantlle Railway was passed on 20 May 1825. The Nantlle Railway Company was incorporated in June 1825 to construct and operate the railway, and in August 1825 it advertised for a sub-contractor to build the line. The company raised a working capital of £20,000 by issuing shares at £100 each. Most of the shareholders were owners of the quarries served by the line. The chief engineer was the railway pioneer George Stephenson, and construction was overseen by his son Robert, who was assisted by John Gillespie.

The line was run as a toll road with customers charged a fee for their goods to be hauled to their destination.

Construction
On 21 March 1827, a second Act was passed, authorising an additional £70,000 of shares to finance construction. The act mortgaged the railway's infrastructure, and restricted the fees it could charge until all debts were paid. On 23 May 1828, in response to slower than expected progress, a third Act was passed extending by five years the time available for construction. Robert Williams of Bangor was appointed the resident engineer and William Owen of Gwaenfynydd, Anglesey was contracted to construct the railway.

The short Coed Helen Tunnel carried the line underneath a road on a gentle gradient, rising from north to south.

It is built from rusticated stone blocks. In September 1999, the Afon Gwyrfai Bridge was listed as a Grade II structure.

The Nantlle Railway was single track throughout, with 22 passing loops but without any signals. Trains ran from one passing place to the next using line of sight to ensure safe working. This led to disputes when trains met between passing loops.

Ownership changes and later use
The Nantlle Railway was acquired by the Carnarvonshire Railway. On 25 July 1867, the line from Pant on the southern edge of Caernarfon at Coed Helen, to Tyddyn Bengam, north of Penygroes, was replaced by a single-track standard-gauge line.

In July 1870, the Carnarvonshire Railway and the remaining narrow-gauge section of the Nantlle Railway was acquired by the London and North Western Railway (LNWR).

Slates were loaded onto narrow gauge wagons near the quarries and drawn by horses to Tyddyn Bengam, where the narrow gauge wagons and their contents were loaded onto standard-gauge transporter wagons, three at a time. North of Pant, the narrow gauge wagons were unloaded onto the narrow-gauge tracks and hauled by horses along the last  to the quayside at Caernarfon Harbour. This process was slow, costly.

In 1870, the LNWR extended the standard gauge line north from Pant to Caernarfon Station where it met a branch built from Bangor in 1852. In December 1871, the standard gauge tracks were extended onto the quayside, removing the need for transhipment and the isolated Caernarfon section of the Nantlle was abandoned. This was built partly on a new alignment and partly over the narrow gauge tracks. Extensive transshipment yards were laid out at 'Nantlle' where slate arriving on the narrow-gauge was loaded into standard-gauge wagons.

It was operated by the LNWR until 1923 when it was absorbed into the London Midland and Scottish Railway (LMS). From 1948, the line was owned and operated by British Railways (BR).

In its final years, the line attracted enthusiasts' railtours. When the Ffestiniog Railway celebrated its Centenary of Steam on 22 May 1963, a Nantlle horse and handler hauled a demonstration train at Porthmadog.

The railway was closed in 1963, when the branch to which it was connected was shut. The last recorded use of horses by BR was on the Nantlle railway.

Rolling stock
The narrow gauge line was a wagonway constructed to a gauge of 3 ft 6 in (1,067 mm) and equipped with four wheeled wagons fitted with double-flanged wheels, which were loose on fixed axles. For many of their later years many wagons had extended axles which protruded beyond the wheels. Some wagons had eyes bolted to the tops of their sides to enable them to be lifted bodily by the Blondins used in some of the quarries. The wagons were owned by the tramway, rather than the quarries and the many that survived into BR ownership had narrow steel plate bodies, which were mounted between the wheels and bolted to the axles. Their shape and structure appears to have changed little from the railway's earliest years.

Modern times
Much of the route has been built over, but in 2016 the remains of three significant Nantlle Railway structures could still be found:

 a tunnel at Coed Helen, just visible from passing Welsh Highland Railway trains
 a bridge near 
 a tunnel at Plas Dinas

See also
Welsh Highland Railway
British industrial narrow gauge railways

References

Sources

Further reading

External links 
 
 
 
 
 
 
 
 
 
 
 
 
 
 
 
 
 
 

Welsh Highland Railway
Early Welsh railway companies
Slate industry in Wales
Industrial railways in Wales
3 ft 6 in gauge railways in Wales
Railway companies established in 1825
Railway lines opened in 1828
Railway companies disestablished in 1865
Horse-drawn railways
British companies established in 1825
1925 establishments in Wales
Railway inclines in Wales